Brother is a rock band incorporating Celtic rock (with bagpipes), mongrel rock, Australian rock and didgeridoo. They record on their own Rhubarb Records label, and gained a worldwide following with their meld of Celtic music and dress with alternative rock and style.

History 

The Richardson brothers – Hamish, Angus and Fergus – grew up in Bathurst and attended the Scots School, where they participated in the School's pipe band. Brother formed in 1992 around the nucleus of the Richardson brothers with Hamish on didgeridoo, bagpipes and guitar, Angus on bass guitar and bagpipes, and Fergus on guitar and bagpipes. They began touring pubs in Sydney.

After releasing their first album, Black and White, which they had self-produced for their own label, Rhubarb Records in 1992. Their track, "An Daorach Beag", was used on the soundtrack to the film, Baraka (September 1992). In the following year they scored an opening spot on Joe Walsh's Australian tour.

Fergus left Brother in 1996 and worked as a film maker. He was based in Arizona, running a boutique production house, with his wife.

A live album, 2000's This Way Up, was met with critical acclaim and an opportunity to perform at the Rock and Roll Hall of Fame.

In March 2007, Hamish left the band to live on the south coast of New South Wales, working in journalism and running a 50-member secular gospel choir.

In 2007 the song "Photograph" by Brother appeared on a compilation CD containing songs associated with Bathurst.

The band mainly plays in the United States but returns to Bathurst regularly. They have undertaken numerous tours around the US and the world. They have played Milwaukee, Wisconsin's Summerfest and Bethlehem, Pennsylvania's Musikfest.

In 2011, Brother served a British band, also named Brother, with a writ asserting trademark infringement; the Australian group won the legal case, and the British group changed its name to Viva Brother.

Members

Angus Richardson: bass guitar, bagpipes
Dave Allen (Dalbo)
Drew Reid

Albums

Black White (1992)
Pipe Dreams (1994)
Exit From Screechville (1995)
Black Stone Tramp (1996)
Digging Bone (1997)
Your Backyard (1998)
This Way Up (2000) (live)
I You You Me (2001)
Urban Cave (2003)
Pax Romana MMV (2005)
The Terrain Around Here is Far Too Dangerous (live - Two Roads Theatre 02.26.06)
As You Were (compilation, 2006)
One Day (2008)
out from under  (2010)
From the Dreamtime to the Meantime (2013)
Last Man Standing (2015)

DVDs

Mongrel Mythology Vol. 1

References

External links

 

New South Wales musical groups
Australian rock music groups
Musical groups established in 1992